Helene Demuth (30 December 1820 – 4 November 1890) was a German housekeeper who worked for Jenny and Karl Marx, and later served as the household manager and political confidante of Friedrich Engels.

Biography
Helena Demuth was born of peasant parents on 31 December 1820 in Sankt Wendel in today's Saarland. In 1840 Helena and her older sister worked in Trier as maids, Helena in von Westphalen household, her sister in the house of a soapmaker two blocks away. They only worked there for about a year, then Katharina got pregnant and both went back to St. Wendel. In 1843 Helena lived in St. Wendel in the house of her mother in Grabenstrasse. In 1843 Karl Marx married Jenny von Westphalen. Helena Demuth joined their household in April 1845 in Brussels, where she was sent by Jenny's mother. She stayed with the Marxes as a lifelong housekeeper, friend, and political confidante, and was commonly known to the family by the nicknames Lenchen or Nim.

After Marx's death in March 1883, Helena Demuth moved to Engels's home, where she ran the household. The pair worked in tandem to organize and arrange for the publication of Marx's literary estate, discovering in the process the manuscript from which Engels was able to reconstruct the second volume of Das Kapital.

In October 1890, Helena was diagnosed with cancer. She died in London on 4 November that year at the age of 69. In accordance with Jenny Marx's wishes, she was buried in the Marx family grave and later re-interred in the tomb of Karl Marx at Highgate Cemetery.

Frederick Demuth
On 23 June 1851 Helene Demuth gave birth to a boy, Henry Frederick Demuth, the birth certificate leaving the name of the father blank. Some scholars accept that the child had been sired by Karl Marx, a view that reflects surviving correspondence from the Marx family and their wider circle, as well as the fact that Marx's wife had been on a trip abroad nine months prior to the birth. The baby was given Friedrich Engels' first name, and family correspondence suggests that Engels, a bachelor living in Manchester and Karl Marx's closest personal friend, claimed fatherhood of the boy. But that correspondence was written years after the actual event by one of Marx's daughters, who knew it from hearsay.

The child's paternity, however, remains a subject of discussion, with the academic Terrell Carver stating that, although it has been claimed since 1962 that Marx was the father, "this is not well founded on the documentary materials available", adding that "the gossip" is not supported by "direct evidence that bears unambiguously on this matter".

Shortly after the birth, the baby, Frederick Lewis Demuth (1851–1929), was placed with a working class foster family in London named Lewis. He later trained as a toolmaker, and was active in the Amalgamated Engineering Union and a founder member of the Hackney Labour Party. Eleanor Marx, Marx's youngest daughter, came to know Frederick some time after her father's death and made him a family friend.

Notes and references

External links 
 Helene Demuth
 Terrel Carver, "Marx’s ‘Illegitimate Son’ ...or Gresham’s Law in the World of Scholarship,"

1820 births
1890 deaths
People from Sankt Wendel (district)
Karl Marx
German domestic workers
Burials at Highgate Cemetery
German emigrants to England